Palparinae is an antlion subfamily in the family Myrmeleontidae.

References

External links 

Myrmeleontidae
Insect subfamilies